Atlantic Starr is the self-titled debut album by R&B/funk band Atlantic Starr. Produced by  Bobby Eli, founding member and lead guitarist of Philadelphia studio group MFSB.  The nine-piece band had an impressive showing on the Billboard R&B charts with "Stand Up", "Keep It Comin'", "(I'll Never Miss) The Love I Never Had" and "With Your Love I Come Alive".

Track listing
All songs written by Bobby Eli and Jeff Prusan; arranged by Bobby Eli, except where noted.

"Stand Up" (Wayne I Lewis; arranged by Bobby Eli and Atlantic Starr) - 4:29
"Keep It Comin'" - 4:35
"Visions" - 3:32
"Being in Love With You Is So Much Fun" (Wayne Lewis; arranged by Atlantic Starr and Bobby Eli) - 3:57
"(I'll Never Miss) The Love I Never Had" - 3:55
"Gimme Your Lovin'" - 4:57 (arranged by Atlantic Starr and Bobby Eli)
"With Your Love I Come Alive" - 4:16
"We Got It Together" - 3:53
"Don't Abuse My Love" (Wayne Lewis, Sharon Bryant, Porter Carroll; arranged by Atlantic Starr and Bobby Eli) - 2:56
"Where There's Smoke There's Fire" - 4:23

Personnel
Atlantic Starr
 Wayne Lewis – keyboards, backing vocals, lead vocals (1, 6)
 David Lewis – guitars, backing vocals, lead vocals (2, 3, 5, 10)
 Clifford Archer – bass
 Porter Carroll, Jr. – drums, backing vocals, lead vocals (3, 7)
 Sharon Bryant – percussion, backing vocals, lead vocals (2, 4, 8, 9)
 Joseph Phillips – percussion, congas, flute
 Damon Rentie – saxophones, flute
 Jonathan Lewis – trombone, percussion
 William Sudderth III – trumpet

Additional musicians
 Bobby Eli – guitars, sitar, percussion
 Steve Mallory – saxophone
 Don Renaldo and The Philly Strings –  strings
 Paul Shure – concertmaster

Production
 Bobby Eli – producer 
 Bob Hughes – engineer
 Bob Mockler – additional engineer
 Skip Cottrell – assistant engineer 
 Pat Flaherty – assistant engineer 
 Doug Graves – assistant engineer 
 Bob Higgins – assistant engineer
 Steve Katz – assistant engineer 
 Ellis Sorkin – assistant engineer 
 Bernie Grundman – mastering 
 Roland Young – art direction
 Phil Shima – design 
 John Hamagami – illustration 
 Mark Hanauer – photography 
 Earl Cole, Jr.– management

Charts

Singles

References

External links
 Atlantic Starr-Atlantic Starr at Discogs
 

1978 debut albums
A&M Records albums
Atlantic Starr albums
Albums recorded at A&M Studios